Sandra Lynes is a Canadian para-alpine skier. She represented Canada at the 1992 Winter Paralympics and at the 1994 Winter Paralympics.

At 1992 Winter Paralympics, she won the silver medals in the Women's Downhill LW5/7,6/8 and the Women's Giant Slalom LW5/7,6/8 events.

At the 1994 Lillehammer Winter Paralympic Games in Norway, Lynes placed 5th in the LW6 / 8 giant slalom, and 4th in two other races: downhill, and super-G, category LW6 / 8. In the Slalom LW6/8, she did not finish.

See also 
 List of Paralympic medalists in alpine skiing

References 

Living people
Year of birth missing (living people)
Place of birth missing (living people)
Paralympic alpine skiers of Canada
Canadian female alpine skiers
Alpine skiers at the 1992 Winter Paralympics
Alpine skiers at the 1994 Winter Paralympics
Medalists at the 1992 Winter Paralympics
Paralympic silver medalists for Canada
Paralympic medalists in alpine skiing